Open Asset Import Library (Assimp) is a cross-platform 3D model import library which aims to provide a common application programming interface (API) for different 3D asset file formats. Written in C++, it offers interfaces for both C and C++. Bindings to other languages (e.g., BlitzMax, C#, Python) are developed as part of the project or are available elsewhere. Given the importance and the benefits of Assimp, a pure Java (/Kotlin) port is being developed here.

The imported data is provided in a straightforward, hierarchical data structure. Configurable post processing steps (i.e., normal and tangent generation, various optimizations) augment the feature set.

Assimp currently supports 57 different file formats for reading, including COLLADA (.dae), 3DS, DirectX X, Wavefront OBJ and Blender 3D (.blend). As of Version 3.0 Assimp also provides export functionality for some file formats.

Projects using Assimp
Several open source projects use Assimp, such as Godot, MonoGame and Urho3D.

See also

 OpenCTM
 MeshLab

References

External links 
 Official project page

C++ libraries
Graphics libraries
Software using the BSD license